Cecily Brooke von Ziegesar (born June 27, 1970) is an American author best known for the young adult Gossip Girl series of novels.

Early life and education
Cecily von Ziegesar was born in New York City into a German noble family. She is the daughter of Franz Albrecht von Ziegesar, the CEO and Chairman of Bowne & Co., and his second wife, Olivia James. She is the half-sister of writer Peter von Ziegesar. Her childhood dream was to grow up to be a ballerina; she began lessons at age three and auditioned for the School of American Ballet at age eight, but was rejected. As a teenager, she commuted from Connecticut to Manhattan at 6:00 a.m. every day to attend The Nightingale-Bamford School.  After graduating from Nightingale, Ziegesar attended Colby College. Then she spent a year in Budapest working for a local radio station. She then returned to the United States to study creative writing at the University of Arizona, only to drop out shortly thereafter.

Career

Gossip Girl

Book series
In New York City, while working at book-packaging firm Alloy Entertainment, she became inspired to create the Gossip Girl series, which presents a view of high-end teenage lifestyles. The series climbed to the top of The New York Times Best-Sellers list in 2002. A spin-off book series, The It Girl, made the list in 2005.

The Constance Billard School for Girls is based on an exaggerated version of Ziegesar's own alma mater, Nightingale.

In October 2011, Ziegesar released a spin-off of her first novel: Psycho Killer.

Television series

Gossip Girl was adapted for television by The CW in 2007. Though fans of the book series criticized it for veering away from the book in plot and character personalities, Ziegesar stated that the major plot outline remained true to her vision, and that she was pleased that "at least it takes place in New York City". On May 16, 2011, Ziegesar herself made a cameo appearance in the fourth season finale.

Graphic novel series
In December 2009, Yen Press announced that it was working with South Korean artist Baek Hye-Kyung to create a graphic novel adaptation of the series titled Gossip Girl: For Your Eyes Only. Rather than adapting the original novels, however, the graphic novels will feature original stories with the same characters. It will be serialized in the company's anthology magazine Yen Plus, with the first chapter appearing in the January 2010 issue.

Personal life
Von Ziegesar resides in the Columbia Street Waterfront District, a neighborhood in Brooklyn, with her husband Richard, who is Chief Operating Officer of the Judd Foundation, and their children Agnes Belle von Ziegesar Griggs and Oscar von Ziegesar Griggs.

Books

Gossip Girl

 Gossip Girl (2002)
 You Know You Love Me (2002)
 All I Want Is Everything (2003)
 Because I'm Worth It (2003)
 I Like It Like That (2004)
 You're the One That I Want (2004)
 Nobody Does It Better (2005) Nothing Can Keep Us Together (2005) Only in Your Dreams (2006) (written by ghost-writer)
 Would I Lie To You? (2006) (written by ghost-writer)
 Don't You Forget About Me (2007) (written by ghost-writer)
 I Will Always Love You (2009) (written by ghost-writer)

 PREQUEL It Had To Be You (2007) Psycho Killer (Spin-Off the original first novel; October 2011)

The It Girl
 This series was written by a ghost-writer, with guidance from Cecily von Ziegesar. The It Girl Notorious Reckless Unforgettable Lucky Tempted Infamous Adored Devious ClassicGossip Girl: The Carlyles
 This series is actually written by Annabelle Vestry, though Cecily von Ziegesar's name is on the spine and front. Gossip Girl: The Carlyles (2008) You Just Can't Get Enough (2008) Take A Chance on Me (2009) Love the One You're With (2009)Cum Laude
 Cum Laude (June 1, 2010 from Hyperion) republished under the name "Class" in 2011.

 Cobble Hill 

 Cobble Hill,'' 2020.

References

External links
 UK Gossip Girl Website
 MTVCanada

1970 births
Living people
American expatriates in Hungary
21st-century American novelists
American women novelists
Gossip Girl
Writers from Brooklyn
People from Fairfield County, Connecticut
American writers of young adult literature
Colby College alumni
21st-century American women writers
Women writers of young adult literature
Novelists from New York (state)
American people of German descent
German untitled nobility
Cecily
Nightingale-Bamford School alumni